Albert Frederick Orme (27 March 1937 – 27 November 2008) was a New Zealand rugby player, lawyer and politician.

Biography
Orme was born in 1937 in Rotorua. As a teenager he was sent to board at Waitaki Boys' High School in Oamaru, where he was the only Māori student at the school. He starred in Waitaki Boys' first XV rugby team plating in the backline. While studying law at University of Canterbury he played in the university team as a first-five. He played provincial rugby for Canterbury from 1959 to 1962. He was selected for the New Zealand Māori team to play against France in their 1961 tour and later toured North America with the New Zealand Universities XV in 1962. While at university he was elected president of the University of Canterbury Students' Association. After he graduated in 1967 he worked for the Public Trust Office in Christchurch.

He was elected to the Christchurch City Council, on the Labour Party ticket, in 1971. On the council he served on the museum and airport committees. He forged links with Ngai Tahu and North Island iwi in the city and was a finalist for the Young Māori of the Year award in 1971. He was awarded a Winston Churchill Fellowship and studied international race relations in London. Based at New Zealand's High Commission offices, he spent most of time with Lord Louis Mountbatten and leading members of the British legal establishment. He attended the 1972 Munich Olympics as a city council representative, exploring ideas for Christchurch hosting the 1974 Commonwealth Games. By the end of the council term Orme was embroiled in a public stoush over parking fines. The bad publicity contributed to him being defeated at the 1974 election in the West Ward.

After leaving the council he first began to suffer ill-health but proceeded to study overseas. After returning to New Zealand he settled in Auckland, where he became involved in Treaty issues and Māori land claims. He also did legal work, mainly for Māori and Pacific Islanders, in court on criminal matters. Orme often did not charge clients, though many paid him sums of money years afterwards. He was also involved in the establishment of law courses in Māori land and Treaty issues at the University of Auckland.

Orme contested the Panmure electorate as a New Zealand Party candidate at the 1984 general election. He finished third out of five contenders. He was one of the party's highest polling candidates nationwide.

When ill health ended his career, he moved back to Rotorua. He died in Rotorua on 27 November 2008, aged 71. He was buried in Rotorua Cemetery.

Notes

References

1937 births
2008 deaths
Rugby union fly-halves
Canterbury rugby union players
Māori All Blacks players
20th-century New Zealand lawyers
New Zealand Labour Party politicians
Christchurch City Councillors
New Zealand Party politicians
Unsuccessful candidates in the 1984 New Zealand general election